Khosrow Shir (also Romanized as Khosrow Shīr and Khusroshir) is a village in Miyan Jovin Rural District, Helali District, Joghatai County, Razavi Khorasan Province, Iran. At the 2006 census, its population was 384, in 100 families.

References 

Populated places in Joghatai County